Sar Chakrya Thon (born 1989), known professionally as Adda Angel, is a Cambodian songwriter and music producer. She is known for being a pioneer in the Cambodian Original Music Movement.

Life and career

Adda began her career as one of Cambodia's first female rap artist with the stage name DJ Adda. She is currently considered one of the top female pop stars of the new Cambodian Original Music scene. She has shared the stage with international acts such as CL (singer) and Rain (entertainer). She is currently signed to Smart Axiata Music Division.

Adda has been an outspoken proponent for original song composition in the Cambodian music industry, publicly criticizing trends in Cambodian contemporary music which copies melodies from existing foreign songs.

In 2012, Adda had a public Facebook row with Cambodian actor Kong Chomrong. The matter escalated to with threats of legal action but was ultimately resolved out of court.

Her top three songs, គ្រាប់ពេជ្រ (Diamond), ពីរនាក់បានហេីយ (Just the Two of Us) and ភ្លើង (Fire) have over 20 million views on YouTube, with Diamond staying in the Top 10 Smart Music Chart for over one year.

In November, 2017, she announced her relationship with American-Cambodian product designer and businessman Allen Dodgson Tan.

In April, 2018, Adda announced the opening of her own beauty salon named Adda & Hair, located in Phnom Penh.

As actress/presenter

Discography

Achievements

|-
| 2017
| Most Popular Female Artist
| The Mic Cambodia
| 
| 
|

References

External links

21st-century Cambodian women singers
Female music video directors
1989 births
Living people